Gardner's spiny-rat (Proechimys gardneri) is a spiny rat species found in Bolivia and Brazil.

Phylogeny
Morphological characters and mitochondrial cytochrome b DNA sequences showed that P. gardneri belongs to the so-called gardneri group of Proechimys species. Within this clade, Proechimys gardneri is more closely related to P. pattoni than to P. kulinae.

References

Proechimys
Mammals described in 1998
Taxa named by Maria Nazareth Ferreira da Silva